The drab hemispingus (Pseudospingus xanthophthalmus) is a species of bird in the family Thraupidae.

It is found in Bolivia and Peru. Its natural habitat is subtropical or tropical moist montane forests.

References

Birds described in 1874
Fauna of South America
xanthophthalmus
Taxonomy articles created by Polbot